The Mayskoye mine is one of the largest gold mines in Russia and in the world. The mine is located in the Ichuveem Range, Chukotka Autonomous Okrug. , the mine had estimated reserves of 7.2 million oz of gold.

References 

Gold mines in Russia
Economy of Chukotka Autonomous Okrug